A terrier is a type of dog. It may also refer to:

Entertainment
 Terrier (novel), by Tamora Pierce
 Terriers (TV series), on the FX network, 2010

Sports
 Boston University Terriers, the athletics teams of Boston University
 St. Francis Terriers, the athletics teams of St. Francis College, Brooklyn Heights, New York 
 Wofford Terriers, the athletics team of Wofford College, South Carolina
 Huddersfield Town A.F.C., association football club in England, nicknamed 'The Terriers' 
 David Terrier (born 1973), French football defender
 Yorkton Terriers, a junior ice hockey team in Yorkton, Saskatchewan, Canada

Transportation
 Beagle Terrier, a British monoplane
 Terrier Armoured Digger, engineering vehicle of the British Army
 LB&SCR A1 class, a class of British railway locomotive commonly known as Terriers
 , more than one United States Navy ship

Other uses
 Terrier Search Engine (aka TERabyte RetrIEveR), a search engine
 Glebe terrier, a Church of England inventory document
 Land terrier, a record of landholdings
 Saint-Loup-Terrier, a commune in the Ardennes department in northern France
 RIM-2 Terrier, a Cold War surface-to-air missile of the US Navy
 Territorial Army (United Kingdom),  nicknamed the "Terriers"
 Terriers, a suburb of High Wycombe, a town in England

See also
 Galt Terriers (disambiguation)
 Orillia Terriers (disambiguation)
 Staffordshire Terrier (disambiguation)